The San Diego City Council is the legislative branch of government for the city of San Diego, California. The city council was first established in San Diego in 1850. The council uses a strong mayor system with a separately elected mayor who acts as the executive. There are currently nine members of the council. City council members serve a four-year term and are limited to two successive terms.

History
San Diego was first incorporated as a city government with a common council on March 27, 1850. However, the city went bankrupt in 1852 and the council was replaced by a board of trustees. A new charter was adopted in 1889 reestablishing a common council under the strong mayor form of government. The common council consisted of two houses, a nine-member board of aldermen and an eighteen-member board of delegates. The council was consolidated into one nine-member house in 1905 and reduced to a five-member commission in 1909.

In 1931 a new charter established a council-manager government. This charter is still in effect today with modifications. The new charter included a seven-member council. Six council members were nominated in districts and voted on citywide. The mayor was the leader of the council and elected citywide. This form of government was modified over time by the electorate. Notable changes include expanding the council to eight districts in 1963, making the council a full-time job in 1974, electing council members by district in 1988, and establishing term limits in 1992.

In 2005 two city council members, Ralph Inzunza and Deputy Mayor Michael Zucchet – who briefly took over as acting mayor when Murphy resigned – were convicted of extortion, wire fraud, and conspiracy to commit wire fraud for taking campaign contributions from a strip club owner and his associates, allegedly in exchange for trying to repeal the city's "no touch" laws at strip clubs. Both subsequently resigned. Inzunza was sentenced to 21 months in prison. In 2009, a judge acquitted Zucchet on seven out of the nine counts against him, and granted his petition for a new trial on the other two charges; the remaining charges were eventually dropped.

In 2006 the city's form of government changed back to a strong mayor system. The change was made for a 5-year trial period by a citywide vote in 2004 and was made permanent by another vote of the electorate in June 2010. The Mayor of San Diego is, in effect, the chief executive officer of the city, while the council is the legislative body. Since December 2012 there have been nine members of the council, expanded from eight under the terms of a city ballot measure passed in June 2010.

Duties and powers
As members of the legislative branch of the City of San Diego, the city council has the authority to introduce and pass the ordinances and resolutions that make up the city's ruling documents. Each council member has the right to vote on all questions brought before the city council. All council actions require an affirmative vote of five council members to pass unless a greater number is required by other superseding law. With some exceptions, the mayor has the right to veto legislation passed by the council. This veto can be overridden by an affirmative vote of six members of the city council.

The city council has the right to determine its own rules and order of business for council meetings. This includes the right to establish and modify council committees, advisory boards, and citizen committees. Under current rules, a council president and president pro tempore are elected each year to serve as the presiding officers of the city council.

The salary for council members was set at $75,386 in 2003. In March 2012, the city's Salary Setting Commission proposed that council members be paid $175,000, but the city council unanimously rejected the recommendation. In November 2018, voters passed Measure L which ties future City Council salaries to those of Superior Court judges. As of December 2020, the council member salary is $124,000.

Elections

Each city council member is elected from a single-member district. Elections follow a two-round system. The first round of the election is called the primary election. The top-two candidates in the primary election advance to a runoff election, called the general election. Write-in candidates are only allowed to contest the primary election and are not allowed in the general election. Council members are elected to four-year terms, with a two-term limit. City council seats are all officially non-partisan by state law, although most members identify a party preference.

The most recent general election was held in 2022 for districts 2, 4, 6, and 8. The next elections for these seats will be held in 2026. General elections for districts 1, 3, 5, 7, and 9 were last held in November 2020. The next election for these seats will be in 2024.

Current Council
Members of the City Council are elected from 9 single-member districts and include Councilmembers Joe LaCava, Jennifer Campbell, Stephen Whitburn, Monica Montgomery, Marni von Wilpert, Kent Lee, Raul Campillo, Vivian Moreno, and Sean Elo-Rivera. The districts cover the following neighborhoods, approximately. The current members of the 2022–2024 City Council were sworn on December 12, 2022.

Committees

As of the term beginning December 2021, the city council has the following nine committees.

*The chair of the Budget and Government Efficiency Committee serves as chair of the Budget Review Committee and the Council President serves as vice chair.

City councilmembers also take on positions in county and regional committees with the mayor:

 SANDAG: Mayor Todd Gloria & Council President Sean Elo-Rivera.
 San Diego Metropolitan Transit System: Mayor Todd Gloria, Monica Montgomery Steppe, Sean Elo-Rivera, & Vivian Moreno.

See also

 Mayor of San Diego
 San Diego County Board of Supervisors

References

External links
San Diego City Council Official Website

California city councils
Local government in California